Odell Lake may refer to:

Odell Lake (Arizona), a reservoir in Coconino County
Odell Lake (New York), a lake in Delaware County
Odell Lake (Oregon), a lake in Klamath County
Odell Lake (video game), a 1986 educational computer game